Kieran Govers (born 9 February 1988) is an Australian field hockey player.  He plays field hockey professionally in Germany. He plays for the NSW Waratahs in the Australian Hockey League.  He first represented Australia in 2010.  He won a gold medal at the 2010 Men's Hockey World Cup, at the 2010 Men's Hockey Champions Trophy and the 2014 Commonwealth Games.  He won a bronze medal at the 2012 Summer Olympics.

Personal
Govers is from New South Wales.
His younger brother is international hockey player Blake Govers.

Field hockey
Govers played junior hockey in Albion Park, New South Wales. He plays hockey professionally. In 2011, he played club hockey for Mannheim in Germany. In Australia, he plays local club hockey for Sutherland District Hockey club.  He played hockey for the Illawarra club in 2011.

State team
He plays for the NSW Warrtahs in the Australian Hockey League. He played for the team in the first found of the 2011 season.

National team
Govers first made the national team in 2010. He made his full international appearance in the Hobart-based three-Test series against South Korea. He won a gold medal at the 2010 World Cup, playing in every single game of the campaign. He was left off the roster for the 2010 Commonwealth Games, because Australia has a rotational policy for team inclusion. He was a member of the 2010 Australian gold winning side that competed at the Champions Trophy and competed in the first three games of the Champions Trophy. He did not play final game despite making an effort to get selected for it by the national team coach. His laryngitis was one of the reasons that he was did not play in the game so he watched the game from the sidelines.

In 2011, he represented Australia in almost every tournament the country participated in. He was not a member of the 2011 Champions Cup squad because he had a groin injury. He did not compete at the Azlan Shah Cup in Malaysia in May 2011 because he was injured. In December 2011, he was named as one of twenty-eight players to be on the 2012 Summer Olympics Australian men's national training squad. This squad will be narrowed in June 2012.  He trained with the team from 18 January to mid-March in Perth, Western Australia. In February during the training camp, he played in a four nations test series with the teams being the Kookaburras, Australia A Squad, the Netherlands and Argentina. In a game for the Kookaburras against Argentina, his team won 4-0 and he scored a goal.

He was part of the Australian team that won the 2014 Commonwealth Games.

References

External links
 
 
 
 

1988 births
Living people
Australian male field hockey players
Olympic field hockey players of Australia
Olympic bronze medalists for Australia
Olympic medalists in field hockey
Field hockey players at the 2012 Summer Olympics
Medalists at the 2012 Summer Olympics
Commonwealth Games medallists in field hockey
Commonwealth Games gold medallists for Australia
Field hockey players at the 2014 Commonwealth Games
Sportspeople from Wollongong
Hockey India League players
HC Den Bosch players
Sportsmen from New South Wales
2010 Men's Hockey World Cup players
2014 Men's Hockey World Cup players
Medallists at the 2014 Commonwealth Games